The 2004 Western Illinois Leathernecks football team represented Western Illinois University as a member of the Gateway Football Conference in the 2004 NCAA Division I-AA football season. They were led by sixth-year head coach Don Patterson and played their home games at Hanson Field in Macomb, Illinois. The Leathernecks finished the season with a 4–7 record overall and a 2–5 record in conference play.

The team's 98–7 victory over Division II  broke school and conference records for the most points scored in a game and the largest margin of victory. In addition, running back Travis Glasford broke another school record by scoring six touchdowns, and kicker Justin Langan kicked 14 extra points, one short of the Division I-AA record.

Schedule

References

Western Illinois
Western Illinois Leathernecks football seasons
Western Illinois Leathernecks football